Eupoecilia is a genus of moths belonging to the subfamily Tortricinae of the family Tortricidae. It was described by Stephens in 1829.

Species
Eupoecilia aburica Razowski, 1993
Eupoecilia acrographa (Turner, 1916)
Eupoecilia ambiguella (Hübner, [1796])
Eupoecilia amphimnesta (Meyrick, 1928)
Eupoecilia anebrica Diakonoff, 1983
Eupoecilia angustana (Hübner, [1796-1799])
Eupoecilia anisoneura Diakonoff, 1982
Eupoecilia armifera Razowski, 1968
Eupoecilia cebrana (Hübner, [1811-1813])
Eupoecilia charixantha (Meyrick, 1928)
Eupoecilia citrinana Razowski, 1960
Eupoecilia coniopa Diakonoff, 1984
Eupoecilia cracens Diakonoff, 1982
Eupoecilia crocina Razowski, 1968
Eupoecilia dactylota (Diakonoff, 1952)
Eupoecilia dentana Razowski, 1968
Eupoecilia diana Razowski, 1968
Eupoecilia dynodesma (Diakonoff, 1971)
Eupoecilia engelinae (Diakonoff, 1941)
Eupoecilia eucalypta (Meyrick, 1928)
Eupoecilia inouei Kawabe, 1972
Eupoecilia kobeana Razowski, 1968
Eupoecilia kruegeriana Razowski, 1993
Eupoecilia lata Razowski, 1968
Eupoecilia neurosema (Meyrick, 1938)
Eupoecilia ochrotona Razowski, 1968
Eupoecilia quinaspinalis X.Zhang & H.H.Li, 2008
Eupoecilia reliquatrix (Meyrick, 1928)
Eupoecilia sanguisorbana (Herrich-Schffer, 1856)
Eupoecilia scytalephora (Diakonoff, 1952)
Eupoecilia sumatrana Diakonoff, 1983
Eupoecilia sumbana (Diakonoff, 1953)
Eupoecilia taneces (Diakonoff, 1973)
Eupoecilia tenggerensis (Diakonoff, 1949)
Eupoecilia thalia Diakonoff, 1984
Eupoecilia wegneri (Diakonoff, 1941)
Eupoecilia yubariana Razowski, 2005

Synonyms
Arachniotes Diakonoff, 1952 (type species: Arachniotes dactylota Diakonoff, 1952)
Clysia Hübner, [1825] (type species: Tinea ambiguella Hübner, 1796 [preoccupied])
Clysiana T. B. Fletcher, 1941 [replacement name for Clysia]
Eupecilia Herrich-Schäffer, 1851 [misspelling of Eupoecilia]

See also
List of Tortricidae genera

References

 , 1829, A Systematic Catalogue of British Insects (2): 190.
 , 2005, World Catalogue of Insects 5
 , 2011: Diagnoses and remarks on genera of Tortricidae, 2: Cochylini (Lepidoptera: Tortricidae). SHILAP Revista de Lepidopterología 39 (156): 397–414.
 , 2008, Zootaxa 1692: 55-68

External links
Tortricidae.com

 
Cochylini
Tortricidae genera